Klenovnik is a village and municipality in Croatia in Varaždin County. According to the 2001 census, there are 2,278 inhabitants, absolute majority which are Croats. It is known for Klenovnik Castle.

Municipalities of Croatia
Populated places in Varaždin County